Kenneth Stafford Norris or Kenneth S. Norris (August 11, 1924 – August 16, 1998) was an American marine mammal biologist, conservationist, and naturalist.

Norris did pioneering work on dolphin echolocation. His conservation work included helping establish the University of California Natural Reserve System and work towards passage of the Marine Mammal Protection Act. Norris was a professor at UCLA and UC Santa Cruz.

Selected bibliography

as editor

References

External links and further reading
 Kenneth S. Norris, naturalist, cetologist & conservationist, 1924-1998: an oral history biography. Interviewed by Randall Jarrell and Irene Reti. Regional History Project, University Library, UC Santa Cruz. 1999
 Marine Mammal Science, Oct. 1999, v.15(4). Special issue remembering Dr. Norris.
 Photographs of Ken Norris from the UC Santa Cruz Library's Digital Collections

1924 births
1998 deaths
American marine biologists
University of California, Santa Cruz faculty
University of California, Los Angeles faculty
20th-century American zoologists